Kill often refers to:

Homicide, one human killing another
cause death, to kill a living organism, to cause its death
Other common uses include:
Kill (body of water) - describes a body of water, most commonly a creek (i.e.: Anthony Kill & Bronx Kill)
Kill (command), a computing command

Kill may also refer to:

Media
Kill!, a 1968 film directed by Kihachi Okamoto
Kill (Cannibal Corpse album), 2006
Kill (Electric Six album), 2009
"Kill" (song), a 2008 song by Mell
The Kills -  English-American rock band founded in 2001

Places in Ireland

Republic of Ireland
Kill, County Dublin
Kill, County Kildare
Kill, County Waterford
Kill, Kilbixy, County Westmeath
Kill, Kilcar, County Donegal
Kill, Kilcleagh, County Westmeath

United Kingdom
Kill, County Tyrone, a townland in County Tyrone

Sports
Baserunner kill, a baseball term
Penalty kill, an ice hockey term
Kill, a type of attack in volleyball

See also

 Keal (disambiguation)
 Keel (disambiguation)
 Keele (disambiguation)
 Kiel (disambiguation)
 Kil (disambiguation)
 Kile (disambiguation)
 Kyl (disambiguation)
 Kyle (disambiguation)
 Kyll
 The Kill (disambiguation)
 The Kills (disambiguation)
 Killing (disambiguation)